Janowiec  (German: Johnsbach) is a village in the administrative district of Gmina Bardo, within Ząbkowice Śląskie County, Lower Silesian Voivodeship, in south-western Poland. Prior to 1945 the village belonged to the region of Silesia in Germany. Until 1946 the remaining German population was expelled.

References

Janowiec